Code page 1118 (also known as CP 1118, IBM 01118, Code page 774, CP 774) is a code page used under DOS to write the Lithuanian language. It was previously standardised in Lithuania as LST 1283.

Character set
The following table shows code page 1118. Each character is shown with its equivalent Unicode code point. Only the second half of the table (code points 128–255) is shown, the first half (code points 0–127) being the same as code page 437.

References 

1118